Don't Hurt Yourself may refer to:

 "Don't Hurt Yourself" (Marillion song), from the 2004 album Marbles
 "Don't Hurt Yourself" (Beyoncé song), from the 2016 album Lemonade